Fouchères is a commune in the Aube department in north-central France located at the river Seine.

Population

See also
Communes of the Aube department
List of medieval bridges in France

References

Communes of Aube
Aube communes articles needing translation from French Wikipedia